Enrique 'Quique' Andreu Balbuena (born 20 October 1967) is a Spanish basketball player. He competed in the men's tournament at the 1988 Summer Olympics and the 1992 Summer Olympics.

References

External links
 

1967 births
Living people
Basketball players at the 1988 Summer Olympics
Basketball players at the 1992 Summer Olympics
CB Zaragoza players
FC Barcelona Bàsquet players
Ionikos N.F. B.C. players
Joventut Badalona players
Liga ACB players
Olympic basketball players of Spain
Spanish men's basketball players
1990 FIBA World Championship players
Sportspeople from Valencia
1994 FIBA World Championship players